No Fear: Dangerous Sports is a 1995 pinball game designed by Steve Ritchie and released by Williams. It is based on the clothing line. This game has an extreme sports theme and features skydiving, free climbing, water skiing, extreme skiing, supercross and car racing.  This was the last game Steve Ritchie designed for Williams.

Launch options
When a new ball is launched into the plunger, you are given five launch awards, which is selected when the ball is fired. Unless otherwise noted, the ball is launched through the Skydive lane. Another ball is popped from the right scoop and onto the right inlane.
Start Challenge: Starts lit challenge.
Super Cross Level: Advances the ramps towards Payback Time.
Ball Lock: Ball is locked for multiball. You can lock up to two balls.
Advance Raceway: Advances the Raceway (inner horseshoe lane).
Flipper Skill Shot: You have to shoot the ball up the left ramp for 50 million points.

Challenges
The goal in this game is to complete the five main challenges in order to qualify for the Major Challenges:
Dirt Challenge: Shoot the ramps and the upper loop for points.
Asphalt Challenge: You have to shoot the Raceway or the Skull three times to win.
Water Challenge: All shots are initially lit for 10 million points. Shooting the Tube saucer increases the base value by 5 million points (up to a maximum of 30 million) and adds 10 more seconds to the mode timer.
Snow Challenge
Air Challenge

Major Challenges
After completing the main challenges, the major challenges are lit. They can only be started by shooting the Skull scoop. With the exception of the first challenge, major challenges can only be started by completing the letters in "NO FEAR".
No Limits
Fear Fest
Meet Your Maker: This is a four-ball wizard mode where everything is lit: all shots are 250,000 points, the Raceway inner loop is maxed out at 25 million, return lanes, kickback, Extra Ball, Jackpot, Super Jackpot, and Super Spinner are lit, Payback Time is started by shooting each ramp once, and Autofire (ballsaver) is lit for 20 seconds.

Digital version
No Fear: Dangerous Sports has been released for The Pinball Arcade for several platforms in November 2015 as a WMS-only licensed table and taken down on June 30, 2018 after WMS license expiration. The No Fear logos replace Valvoline ones and names are removed when starting challenges. Moreover, other brands (such as Ford Motor Company, Cummins or Goodyear tires) are converted to fictional ones.

References

External links
IPDB entry for No Fear: Dangerous Sports
Recent Auction Results for No Fear: Dangerous Sports

Williams pinball machines
1995 pinball machines